Choi Young-joon (born 7 July 1980) is a South Korean actor and singer. He is known for his roles in Flower of Evil (2020), Hospital Playlist (2020–21), Vincenzo (2021), and Our Blues (2022).

Career
Choi made his debut in 2002 as a member of boy band 7Dayz. After the group's disbandment, Choi went on to become a musical actor.

In recent years since 2019, Choi was featured in several television dramas, mostly playing supporting roles. His notable roles came from Flower of Evil (2020), Hospital Playlist seasons 1 and 2 (2020-21), Vincenzo (2021), and Our Blues (2022).

Filmography

Television

Television shows

Theater

Awards and nominations

References

External links 
 
 
 Choi Young-joon on Play DB
 

 
1980 births
Living people
21st-century South Korean actors
South Korean male television actors
South Korean male film actors
South Korean stage actors
Dong-a University alumni